Amadou Doumbouya (born 12 October 2002) is a Guinean professional footballer who plays for Djurgårdens IF as a midfielder. 

Doumbouya signed a five year contract with Djurgården in March 2022. He made his Allsvenskan debut for Djurgården in a 4–0 victory home against Varbergs BoIS. 

Doumbouya played in the 2022–23 UEFA Europa Conference League when he was substituted for Haris Radetinac in the second game against Romanian side Sepsi OSK Sfântu Gheorghe on 11 August 2022. He scored the 1–1 equalizer in the second group stage game of the Conference League home against Molde FK on 15 september. Doumbouya's contract with Djurgården was terminated in January 2023.

References

External links 
 

2002 births
Living people
Association football defenders
Guinean footballers
Djurgårdens IF Fotboll players
Allsvenskan players